Dressy Bessy is the third studio album by Dressy Bessy.  It was released on August 26, 2003 (see 2003 in music). The CD came with a bonus DVD that included music videos and live footage of the band.

Track listing
All songs written by Tammy Ealom
"Just Once More"
"The Things That You Say That You Do"
"Baby Six String"
"This May Hurt (A Little)"
"Georgie Blue"
"Girl, You Shout!"
"Hey May"
"New Song (From Me to You)"
"Better Luck"
"Blink Twice"
"Tidy"

References

2003 albums
Dressy Bessy albums
Kindercore Records albums